Kureika is a Russian village just north of the Arctic Circle near Turukhansk in Krasnoyarsk Krai, by the confluence of Kureika River and Yenisey. 

Here Joseph Stalin spent his final exile in 1914–1916. In 1952 a pavilion was built surrounding and preserving the izba (wooden hut) Stalin had lived in during his exile. The museum was closed and hut was demolished, along with Stalin's statue, during de-Stalinization in 1961, and the pavilion was burnt in a fire in 1996.

References

Rural localities in Turukhansky District
Places associated with Joseph Stalin
De-Stalinization